Guillermo Díaz (born March 22, 1975) is an American actor. He is known for films Half Baked (1998), 200 Cigarettes (1999) and Stonewall (1995). He is best known for his role as Diego "Huck" Muñoz in the drama series Scandal. Díaz has made guest appearances on Chappelle's Show, Law & Order, Weeds, ER, Broad City, and Girls.

Early life and career 
Díaz was born in New Jersey to Cuban parents, and grew up in Washington Heights, Manhattan. In 1994, he landed his first speaking role as Spike in Boaz Yakin's Fresh. From there he began working on Party Girl as Leo, Parker Posey's roommate. His next role was a drag queen (La Miranda) in Nigel Finch's Stonewall. In 1996, Díaz worked in Jim McKay's Girls Town as Dylan, after which he appeared in I'm Not Rappaport.

Díaz played Paco de la Vega al Camino Cordoba Jose Cuervo Sanchez Rodriguez Jr., a high school gang member in High School High. He later appeared in Freeway as Flaco, another gang member. While in Los Angeles, he did guest spots on ER and Party of Five.

After finishing work on the West Coast, Díaz traveled back east to play a stoner named Eric in Brian Sloan's film I Think I Do. A similar role followed as Scarface in the film Half Baked. One of his co-stars was Dave Chappelle, who later cast him in several episodes of Chappelle's Show. In 1999, he landed a non-speaking role in 200 Cigarettes, and went on to act in both Ethan Hawke's directorial debut Chelsea Walls and the movie Just One Time, where as secondary characters one critic thought that he and Jennifer Esposito provided what little "comic spark" existed in the film.

Díaz played Guillermo García Gómez, a drug dealer/trafficker, in seasons 2-6 of the series Weeds. In 2009, he starred on the series Mercy, where his portrayal of the gay nurse Angel received negative criticism in online forums for being too flamboyant. In 2010, he appeared in the thriller film Exquisite Corpse.

After having portrayed several Mexican thugs (cholos), Díaz was cast in 2010 as a Latino gangster named Poh Boy in Cop Out. When asked about being typecast, he said: "I [used to worry], but not really anymore. Now I'm just grateful that I'm working. I try to make everything different."

In 2010, Díaz did a photoshoot for Pinups Magazine. The photoshoot featured full frontal nudity from Díaz.

In 2011, Díaz appeared alongside Britney Spears in a music video for the single "I Wanna Go", and took part in a scene referencing his character Scarface from Half Baked.

In 2012, Díaz began his role as Huck in the drama series Scandal.

Díaz was one of the many celebrities that acted in Beyoncé and Jay Z's video for "Run" in 2014.

Personal life 

Díaz is gay. In 2011, he told Out magazine that his rough upbringing in New York City, during which he hid his sexuality so as not to become a target, ultimately made him a better actor. He said: "I went to school in the Bronx. I learned to constantly try to cover up the fact that I was gay. That façade of being somebody I'm really not just to protect myself definitely helped with acting." He was named one of Out Magazine's 100 most influential gay, lesbian, bisexual, or transgender people for 2013.

Díaz has said on multiple occasions that he is a fan of Madonna. He has been to all of her tours apart from The Virgin Tour and The Who's That Girl Tour. He also has her face tattooed on his right arm.

In November 2017, Díaz was nominated to Out magazine's "OUT100" for 2017 in recognition of his work and his visibility.

In popular culture
In 2006, he joined the cast of a series of improv-based commercials for Sierra Mist titled Mist Takes. A Spanish version of the advertisements began airing, and the bilingual Díaz also starred in those with other Latino comedians.

Filmography

Film

Television

Other media

References

External links 
 

American male film actors
American male television actors
American people of Cuban descent
American gay actors
Hispanic and Latino American male actors
LGBT Hispanic and Latino American people
Living people
People from Washington Heights, Manhattan
1975 births
Male actors from New Jersey
Male actors from New York City
LGBT people from New York (state)
LGBT people from New Jersey